The Barrier is a 1926 American silent adventure film produced and distributed by Metro-Goldwyn-Mayer and directed by George Hill. The film stars Lionel Barrymore and Marceline Day and is based on the 1908 wilderness novel of the same name by Rex Beach. Previous versions of the novel had been filmed in 1913 and 1917 respectively. This film is the last silent version to be filmed. The Barrier is a lost film.

Cast

Premiere 
The film’s “world premiere” took place at the West Coast Theatre in San Bernardino, California, on Sunday February 28, 1926, with four showings that day, seen by “thousands.” Subsequent weekday showings were presented twice each evening. A young Ginger Rogers’ vaudeville act was also featured.

See also
 Lionel Barrymore filmography

References

External links

French lobby poster
Dust jacket book cover
Lantern slide(archived)
Still portrait(archived)
Silent Hall of Fame collection of period reviews of the film
Still at www.silentfilmstillarchive.com
Stills at silenthollywood.com

1926 films
1926 adventure films
American adventure films
Lost American films
American silent feature films
American black-and-white films
Films based on adventure novels
Films based on American novels
Films directed by George Hill
Metro-Goldwyn-Mayer films
Films based on works by Rex Beach
Remakes of American films
1926 lost films
Lost adventure films
1920s American films
Silent adventure films
1920s English-language films